Janiwala is a town of Toba Tek Singh District in the Punjab province of Pakistan. It is located at 31°3'0N 72°33'0E with an altitude of 162 metres (534 feet). Neighbouring settlements include Randian and Bilasur. Janiwala railway station is also located in Janiwala village.

References

Populated places in Toba Tek Singh District